David Dreshaj (born 23 September 1999) is a Montenegrin-Albanian singer.

Life and career

1999–present: Early life and career beginnings 

David Dreshaj was born on 23 September 1999 into an  Albanian family in the city of Podgorica, Montenegro. As a child, Dreshaj became interested in music and attended a music school in Podgorica. Following this, the singer enrolled at a college in Albania, studying canto in the same time taking piano and guitar lessons. He started his initial forays into the music industry in 2016 and 2017 as he participated at Kënga Magjike on both occasions with the songs "Të kam" and "Vetëm ne të dy", respectively. Following a year absence, Dreshaj released his follow-up single "Bomb" and reached number 32 in Albania. He scored his first number-one single in September 2019 with "Sierra". Featuring dance-pop and deep house music, the follow-up, "Nuk e dua", eventually reached the top ten in Albania. His chart success ensued into March 2021 with the single "Lonely", marking his fourth chart appearance.

Discography

Singles

As lead artist

References 

1999 births
21st-century Albanian male singers
Albanian guitarists
Albanian pianists
Living people
Albanians in Montenegro
Musicians from Podgorica